Kyo-hwa-so No. 8 Yongdam(용담 8호 교화소) is a "reeducation camp"  with c. 3,000 prisoners in Kangwon, North Korea.

See also 
 Human Rights in North Korea
 Kaechon concentration camp

References

External links 
 Committee for Human Rights in North Korea: The Hidden Gulag - Overview of North Korean prison camps with testimonies and satellite photographs

Concentration camps in North Korea